Nicolás García Saiz (born 18 June 2002) is a Spanish swimmer. He competed in the men's 200 metre backstroke event at the 2020 Olympics.

He also competed in the men's 50 metre backstroke, men's 100 metre backstroke, mixed 4 × 100 metre medley relay and men's 200 metre backstroke events at the 2020 European Aquatics Championships, in Budapest, Hungary.

Biography
He was part of CN Gredos San Diego in Madrid, Spain, until his commitment to Virginia Tech University was made official in October 2021.

References

External links
 

2002 births
Living people
Spanish male backstroke swimmers
Place of birth missing (living people)
Swimmers at the 2020 Summer Olympics
Olympic swimmers of Spain